Hasnat Abdul Hye (born 19 May 1937) is a Bangladeshi writer and novelist. He was awarded Ekushey Padak by the Government of Bangladesh in 1994. As of 2017, he has 70 published works in both Bengali and English.

Early life and education
Hye was born in Calcutta in 1939. His hometown is Sayedabad village, Kasba, BrahmanBaria. He studied economics at the University of Dhaka, the University of Washington, London School of Economics and development studies at Cambridge University.

Career
Hye taught economics at the University of Dhaka for two years before joining the Civil Service of Pakistan in 1965. He retired as a full Secretary of the Bangladesh Government in 2000.

Works 
Hye wrote his first short story Carnival in 1960. His first travelogue is titled Manhattan and Ten Dollars. In 1995, he wrote Novera, a novel based on the life story of the sculptor Novera Ahmed. In 2017, the book was adapted to a stage monodrama, acted by Samiun Jahan Dola.

In 2008, he published Boyhood in British India and Pakistan, a collection of autobiographical columns that appeared in Daily News under the banner Aide Memoire. This covers a period from 1943 to 1954.

TV Camerar Samne Meyeti
On 14 April 2013, Hye published a short story, titled TV Camerar Samne Meyeti (The Girl In Front Of The TV Camera) on  the daily newspaper Prothom Alo. The store centers around a politically active girl Seema leading the slogan shouting brigade who is sexually exploited by a senior politician, the man who recruits her. The story suggested her popularity stemmed from her sexual free-mixing with males. The publication angered readers and amid protests Prothom Alo issued an apology and retracted the story. Few days later, M Wahiduzzaman, a professor at the University of Dhaka, filed a petition with the High Court as a public interest litigation saying the story written by Hye "is provocative and insulting to the women of the society".
 The High Court later rejected the writ petition.

Books

Awards 
Bangla Academy Literary Award (1977)
Alakta literary Prize (1993)
Ekushey Padak (1994)
Jagadish Chandra Basu Prize (1995)
Sher-e-Bangla Prize (1995)
S.M. Sultan Prize (1995)
Shilpacharya Zainul Prize (1996)

Personal life
Hye was married to Nasreen Hye (d. 2012). Together they had a son and a daughter.

References

Living people
1937 births
Writers from Kolkata
Bangladeshi male writers
Bengali-language writers
Recipients of the Ekushey Padak
Recipients of Bangla Academy Award
20th-century Bangladeshi writers
People from Kasba Upazila